Mike Bauer and Piet Norval were the defending champions, but did not participate this year.

David Adams and Menno Oosting won in the final 6–3, 6–4, against Cristian Brandi and Federico Mordegan.

Seeds

  David Adams /  Menno Oosting (champions)
  Tomás Carbonell /  Udo Riglewski (semifinals, withdrew)
  Stefan Kruger /  Libor Pimek (first round)
  Horacio de la Peña /  Mark Koevermans (first round)

Draw

Draw

References

External links
 Draw

Doubles